Francisco Mário Pinto da Silva (born 21 October 1948, in Sesimbra) is a former Portuguese footballer who played as forward.

External links 
 
 

1948 births
Living people
People from Sesimbra
Portuguese footballers
Association football forwards
Primeira Liga players
Boavista F.C. players
G.D. Sesimbra footballers
Portugal international footballers
Sportspeople from Setúbal District